Kocēni Parish is an administrative territorial entity of Valmiera Municipality in the Vidzeme region of Latvia. The administrative center is Kocēni.

Towns, villages and settlements of Kocēni Parish 
 Brandeļi
 Kocēni
 Rubene
 Tožas

See also 
 Henry of Latvia
 Rubene (floorball club)

References

External links

Parishes of Latvia
Valmiera Municipality
Vidzeme